Cg (short for C for Graphics) and High-Level Shader Language (HLSL) are two names given to a  high-level shading language developed by Nvidia and Microsoft for programming shaders. Cg/HLSL is based on the C programming language and although they share the same core syntax, some features of C were modified and new data types were added to make Cg/HLSL more suitable for programming graphics processing units.

Two main branches of the Cg/HLSL language exist: the Nvidia Cg compiler (cgc) which outputs DirectX or OpenGL and the Microsoft HLSL which outputs DirectX shaders in bytecode format. Nvidia's cgc was deprecated in 2012, with no additional development or support available.

HLSL shaders can enable many special effects in both 2D and 3D computer graphics. The Cg/HLSL language originally only included support for vertex shaders and pixel shaders, but other types of shaders were introduced gradually as well:
 DirectX 10 (Shader Model 4) and Cg 2.0 introduced geometry shaders.
 DirectX 11 (Shader Model 5) introduced compute shaders (GPGPU) and tessellation shaders (hull and domain). The latter is present in Cg 3.1.
 DirectX 12 (Shader Model 6.3) introduced ray tracing shaders (ray generation, intersection, bit /closest hit / miss).

Background
Due to technical advances in graphics hardware, some areas of 3D graphics programming have become quite complex. To simplify the process, new features were added to graphics cards, including the ability to modify their rendering pipelines using vertex and pixel shaders.

In the beginning, vertex and pixel shaders were programmed at a very low level with only the assembly language of the graphics processing unit. Although using the assembly language gave the programmer complete control over code and flexibility, it was fairly hard to use. A portable, higher level language for programming the GPU was needed, so Cg was created to overcome these problems and make shader development easier.

Some of the benefits of using Cg over assembly are:
 High level code is easier to learn, program, read, and maintain than assembly code.
 Cg code is portable to a wide range of hardware and platforms, unlike assembly code, which usually depends on hardware and the platforms it's written for.
 The Cg compiler can optimize code and do lower level tasks automatically, which are hard to do and error prone in assembly.

Language

Data types
Cg has six basic data types. Some of them are the same as in C, while others are especially added for GPU programming. These types are:
 float - a 32bit floating point number
 half - a 16bit floating point number
 int - a 32bit integer
 fixed - a 12bit fixed point number
 bool - a boolean variable
 sampler* - represents a texture object

Cg also features vector and matrix data types that are based on the basic data types, such as float3 and float4x4. Such data types are quite common when dealing with 3D graphics programming. Cg also has struct and array data types, which work in a similar way to their C equivalents.

Operators
Cg supports a wide range of operators, including the common arithmetic operators from C, the equivalent arithmetic operators for vector and matrix data types, and the common logical operators.

Functions and control structures
Cg shares the basic control structures with C, like if/else, while, and for. It also has a similar way of defining functions.

Semantics

Preprocessor 
Cg implements many C preprocessor directives and its macro expansion system. It implements .

HLSL features 
 Namespace
 Annotation

Environment

Compilation targets 
Cg programs are built for different shader profiles that stand for GPUs with different capabilities. These profiles decide, among others, how many instructions can be in each shader, how many registers are available, and what kind of resources a shader can use. Even if a program is correct, it might be too complex to work on a profile.

As the number of profile and shader types cropped up, Microsoft has switched to use the term "Shader Model" to group a set of profiles found in a generation of GPUs. Cg supports some of the newer profiles up to Shader Model 5.0 as well as translation to glsl or hlsl.

PS 1.0 — Unreleased 3dfx Rampage, DirectX 8.
PS 1.1 — GeForce 3, DirectX 8.
PS 1.2 — 3Dlabs Wildcat VP, DirectX 8.0a.
PS 1.3 — GeForce 4 Ti, DirectX 8.0a.
PS 1.4 — Radeon 8500-9250, Matrox Parhelia, DirectX 8.1.
Shader Model 2.0 — Radeon 9500-9800/X300-X600, DirectX 9.
Shader Model 2.0a — GeForce FX/PCX-optimized model, DirectX 9.0a.
Shader Model 2.0b — Radeon X700-X850 shader model, DirectX 9.0b.
Shader Model 3.0 — Radeon X1000 and GeForce 6, DirectX 9.0c.
Shader Model 4.0 — Radeon HD 2000 and GeForce 8, DirectX 10.
Shader Model 4.1 — Radeon HD 3000 and GeForce 200, DirectX 10.1.
Shader Model 5.0 — Radeon HD 5000 and GeForce 400, DirectX 11.
Shader Model 5.1 — GCN 1+, Fermi+, DirectX 12 (11_0+) with WDDM 2.0.
Shader Model 6.0 — GCN 1+, Kepler+, DirectX 12 (11_0+) with WDDM 2.1.
Shader Model 6.1 — GCN 1+, Kepler+, DirectX 12 (11_0+) with WDDM 2.3.
Shader Model 6.2 — GCN 1+, Kepler+, DirectX 12 (11_0+) with WDDM 2.4.
Shader Model 6.3 — GCN 1+, Kepler+, DirectX 12 (11_0+) with WDDM 2.5.
Shader Model 6.4 — GCN 1+, Kepler+, Skylake+, DirectX 12 (11_0+) with WDDM 2.6.
Shader Model 6.5 — GCN 1+, Kepler+, Skylake+, DirectX 12 (11_0+) with WDDM 2.7.

"32 + 64" for Executed Instructions means "32 texture instructions and 64 arithmetic instructions."

The standard library
As in C, Cg/HLSL features a set of functions for common tasks in GPU programming.  Some of the functions have equivalents in C, like the mathematical functions abs and sin, while others are specialized in GPU programming tasks, like the texture mapping functions tex1D and tex2D.

The Cg runtime library
Cg programs are merely vertex and pixel shaders, and they need supporting programs that handle the rest of the rendering process.  Cg can be used with two graphics APIs: OpenGL or DirectX.  Each has its own set of Cg functions to communicate with the Cg program, like setting the current Cg shader, passing parameters, and such tasks.

In addition to being able to compile Cg source to assembly code, the Cg runtime also has the ability to compile shaders during execution of the supporting program.  This allows the runtime to compile the shader using the latest optimizations available for hardware that the program is currently executing on. However, this technique requires that the source code for the shader be available in plain text to the compiler, allowing the user of the program to access the source-code for the shader. Some developers view this as a major drawback of this technique.

To avoid exposing the source code of the shader, and still maintain some of the hardware specific optimizations, the concept of profiles was developed. Shaders can be compiled to suit different graphics hardware platforms (according to profiles).  When executing the supporting program, the best/most optimized shader is loaded according to its profile. For instance there might be a profile for a graphics card that supports complex pixel shaders, and another profile for one that supports only minimal pixel shaders. By creating a pixel shader for each of these profiles a supporting program enlarges the number of supported hardware platforms without sacrificing picture quality on powerful systems.'

Compilers and dialects 
The Cg dialect has only ever had one compiler, in the form of Nvidia's Cg toolkit.

Microsoft has released two compilers for HLSL. The original compiler was the closed-source FXC (Effect Compiler), supported until 2015. It was deprecated in favor of the open-source LLVM-based DXC (DirectXShaderCompiler) with support for newer HLSL features. Both compilers generate bytecode: while the older FXC used DXBC, DXC now uses DXIL. DXC can also emit SPIR-V bytecode.

The Khronos Group has also written a LLVM-based HLSL compiler, in the form of a frontend for glslang, their GLSL-to-SPIR_V compiler. Support for SPIR-V means that the shaders can be cross-platform, no longer limiting them to a DirectX stack. This task was previously performed by source-level converters like HLSL2GLSL, but the resulting code is often bloated.

Derived languages 
The PlayStation Shading Language is based on Cg/HLSL.

The ReshadeFX shading language is also based on Cg/HLSL. Shaders written in ReshadeFX are compiled to OpenGL, DX, or Vulkan and injected into games to act as post-processing filters.

Applications and games that use Cg or HLSL

 3DVIA Virtools
 Adobe Photoshop
 Maya
 Battlefield 2
 Cafu Engine
 Crystal Space
 Dolphinity Racer
 Earth's Special Forces - A Half-Life Mod
 Enemy Territory: Quake Wars
 Doom 3 BFG Edition
 EON Professional™/Ultra™ of EON Reality
 eyeon Fusion
 Far Cry
 Garshasp: The Monster Slayer
 GLScene
 Gun Metal
 Hitman: Blood Money
 Irrlicht Engine
 League of Legends
 Lightfeather 3D Engine
 LightWave 11.6
 muvee Reveal
 OGRE
 OpenEmu
 Panda3D
 PCSX2
 PlayStation 3
 RetroArch
 R.U.S.E.
 Snes9x
 Unity game engine
 Unreal Engine

See also
 Computer programming
 Computer graphics
 Vertex and pixel shaders
 High level shader language
 OpenGL shading language
 Shader Model
 OpenGL
 DirectX

References

Further reading
 Randima Fernando, Mark J. Kilgard, The Cg Tutorial: The Definitive Guide to Programmable Real-Time Graphics, Addison-Wesley Professional, 
 Randima Fernando, GPU Gems: Programming Techniques, Tips, and Tricks for Real-Time Graphics, Addison-Wesley Professional, 
 William R. Mark, R. Steven Glanville, Kurt Akeley, Mark J. Kilgard, Cg: A System for Programming Graphics Hardware in a C-like Language, Proceedings of SIGGRAPH 2003,

External links
 cgc-opensrc - Mirror for nvidia's open source compiler, 2002
 Some essential materials (e.g. the design paper) are gathered in these course notes from Siggraph 2005
 Nvidia-hosted materials:
 Cg FAQ
 Cg Toolkit
 Cg Language Reference and Documentation
 NeHe Cg vertex shader tutorial
 Documentation for the Cg Shader standard used by emulators
 Aras Pranckevičius, Cross Platform Shaders in 2014.

C programming language family
Nvidia software
Shading languages
DirectX
Microsoft application programming interfaces